Arthur-Vincent Lourié, born Naum Izrailevich Luria, later changed his name to Artur Sergeyevich Luriye (14 May 1892 in Propoysk – 12 October 1966 in Princeton, New Jersey) was a significant Russian composer. Lourié played an important role in the earliest stages of the organization of Soviet music after the 1917 Revolution but later went into exile. His music reflects his close connections with contemporary writers and artists, and also his close relationship with Igor Stravinsky.

Russian career
Born into a prosperous Jewish family, he converted to Catholicism while still in Russia. An admirer of van Gogh, from whom he derived the name 'Vincent', Lourié was partly self-taught, but also studied piano with Barinova and composition with Glazunov at the Saint Petersburg Conservatory, graduating in 1913. He became friendly with the Futurist poets and particularly Anna Akhmatova, whose poetry he was among the first to set. He was also acquainted with Vladimir Mayakovsky, Nikolai Kulbin, Fyodor Sologub and Alexander Blok; and was deeply influenced by contemporary art. His early piano pieces, from 1908 onward, take on from the late works of Scriabin but evolve new kinds of discourse, arriving in 1914 at an early form of dodecaphony (the Synthèses) and in 1915 at the Formes en l'air, dedicated to Picasso, a rather Cubist conception using an innovative form of notation in which different systems are placed spatially on the page in independent blocks, with blanks instead of bars' rest. At this stage of his career he seems a parallel figure to Nikolai Roslavets, though Lourié's aesthetic appears more 'decadent'. Essentially he was the first Russian Futurist in music, and in 1914 was the co-signatory, with the painter Georgy Yakulov and the poet Benedikt Livshitz, of the Petersburg Futurist Manifesto, 'We and the West', proclaiming principles common to all three arts.

Revolutionary Russia
After the October Revolution of 1917 Lourié served under Lunacharsky as head of the music division (Muzo) of the Commissariat of Popular Enlightenment (Narkompros). For a while he shared a house with Serge Sudeikin and his wife Vera Sudeikina. His tenure proved to be contentious. When he suggested renaming his music department "The People's Tribune for Civil Music", and to style himself  the "People's Tribune", Lunacharsky allegedly replied: "No, Artur Sergeevich, this does not suit us." Alexander Goldenweiser and Mikhail Ippolitov-Ivanov complained to Lenin himself about him. Though his sympathies were Leftist he became increasingly disenchanted with the Bolshevik order in Russia.

Into exile
In 1921 he went on an official visit to Berlin, where he befriended Busoni, and from which he failed to return. His works were thereafter proscribed in the USSR. In 1922 he settled in Paris, where he became friends with the philosopher Jacques Maritain and was introduced to Stravinsky by Vera Sudeykina. Maritain championed his work early on, viewing the young Lourié not only as an important composer, but as a composer with an important capacity to express Catholic theology and philosophy in music. Lourié dedicated a number of his works to Maritain, including the Gigue from 4 Pièces Pour Piano (1928). From 1924 to 1931 he was one of Stravinsky's most important champions, often becoming part of the Stravinsky household as he wrote articles about his fellow composer and preparing piano reductions of his works. He and the Stravinskys eventually parted company over a feud with Vera, and Stravinsky seldom afterwards mentioned his existence. In his works of the Paris years Lourié's early radicalism turns to an astringent form of neoclassicism and Russophile nostalgia; a dialogue with Stravinsky's works of the same period is evident, even to the extent that Stravinsky may have taken ideas from the younger composer: Lourié's A Little Chamber Music (1924) seems to prophesy Stravinsky's Apollon musagète (1927), his Concerto spirituale for chorus, piano and orchestra (1929) the latter's Symphony of Psalms (1930). Certainly in his later works Stravinsky adopted Lourié's style of notation with blank space instead of empty bars. Lourié also composed two symphonies (No. 1 subtitled Sinfonia dialectica) and an opera, The Feast in a Time of Plague. A man of very wide culture, who cultivated the image of a dandy and aesthete, he set poems of Sappho, Pushkin, Heine, Verlaine, Blok, Mayakovsky, Dante, classical Latin and medieval French poets. He was also a talented painter.

American years
When the Germans occupied Paris in 1940, Lourié fled to the USA, assisted by Serge Koussevitzky. He settled in New York. He wrote some film scores but gained almost no performances for his more serious works, though he continued to compose. He spent over ten years writing an opera after Pushkin's The Moor of Peter the Great called The Blackamoor of Peter the Great, so far unperformed, though a lapidary orchestral suite has been recorded. He also composed a setting of sections from T. S. Eliot's Little Gidding for tenor and instruments (1959): this could be seen as another instance of pre-Stravinsky-ing Stravinsky, who set one of the same texts as the anthem The Dove Descending in 1962.

Works
This list is based on that of the Arthur Lourié Society.

Selected recordings
 Arthur Lourié Songs & Choruses: The Rosary, Voice of the muse, on poems of Anna Akhmatova. Cantata In the Sanctuary of a Golden Dream on collected texts of Alexander Blok Natalia Gerassimova, Vladimir Skanavy et al., rec. 1994, reissued by Brilliant (2010)
 Futurpiano: Synthèses (Op. 16), Formes en l'air (for Pablo Picasso). Daniele Lombardi, piano. Rec. 1995. Issued by LTM (2009)
 12 Greek Songs to Texts from Sappho, translated by Viacheslav Ivanov (1914) on: Viacheslav Ivanov in Music of Miaskovsky, Lourié, Shebalin, Gretchaninov Ludmila Shkirtil (mezzo-soprano), Northern Flowers (2010)
 Solo Piano Works, plus Der Irrtum der Frau Tod/Death's Mistake for speaker and piano; 3-CD set, Moritz Ernst (piano), Oskar Ansull (speaker), Capriccio (2016)

References

Л.Корабельникова.Там,за океаном ... В кн: Русские евреи в Америке,кн.1. Ред.-сост. Э.Зальцберг. Иерусалим-Торонто-Москва.2005. С.125-142.

External links 
 Arthur Lourié Gesellschaft, Basel

1892 births
1966 deaths
People from Slawharad District
People from Bykhovsky Uyezd
Belarusian Jews
Jews from the Russian Empire
Belarusian Roman Catholics
Converts to Roman Catholicism from Judaism
Soviet emigrants to the United States
American people of Belarusian-Jewish descent
20th-century classical composers
Belarusian composers
Composers from the Russian Empire
20th-century Russian male musicians
Jewish classical composers
Russian male classical composers
Saint Petersburg Conservatory alumni